Dow or DOW may refer to:

Business
 Dow Jones Industrial Average, or simply the Dow, a stock market index
 Dow Inc., an American commodity chemical company
 Dow Chemical Company, a subsidiary, an American multinational chemical corporation 
 Dow Breweries, a former Canadian brewing company

Ethnicities and languages 
 Dow people, an ethnic group of Brazil
 Dow language
dow, the ISO 639-3 code for the Doyayo language of Cameroon

Places
 County Down, Northern Ireland, Chapman code DOW
 Dow, Illinois, U.S.
 Dow City, Iowa, U.S.
 Dow, Kentucky, U.S.
 Dow Village (disambiguation), two places in Trinidad and Tobago
 Downingtown station, Pennsylvania, U.S., Amtrak station code DOW
 Dow Nunatak, Antarctica
 Dow Peak, Antarctica

Other uses 
 Dow (surname), including a list of people with the name
 Dow Finsterwald (born 1929), American golfer
 Dow process, a method of bromine extraction
 Dow Tennis Classic, an ITF Women's Circuit tennis tournament
 Dow University of Health Sciences, in Pakistan
 Deep ocean water, a marine term
 Died of wounds, a military casualty classification
 Doppler on Wheels, devices used for meteorological research
 Dow Cook, a fictional character in the Fusion comics series
 United States Department of War, an extinct department of the United States government

See also

 Dhow, a traditional sailing ship
 Dowe (disambiguation)
 Dow Jones (disambiguation)
 Dow v. United States, a 1915 United States Court of Appeals case